Nick Hengelman (born 15 November 1989) is a Dutch professional footballer who plays as a goalkeeper.

Career
Hengelman was born in Glanerbrug. He is a youth product from the FC Twente/Heracles Almelo football academy. He formerly played for AGOVV Apeldoorn. When the club was declared bankrupt in January 2013, he joined Vitesse to maintain his fitness. When the club did not offer him a new contract in the summer of 2013, Hengelman found a new club in Achilles '29. He made his début for the team in the first match in professional football for Achilles on 3 August 2013. The game in Emmen ended in 2–2. On 5 August 2014, Hengelman signed with FC Oss.

On 2 August 2019, Hengelman signed with South African club Ajax Cape Town. After a 4th place finish in the National First Division the previous season, Ajax Amsterdam parted ways with their sister club. Hengelman was then given a one-year contract as a fifth choice keeper under Erik ten Hag back in Amsterdam while training with Jong Ajax the reserves team of Ajax for which he is no longer eligible to play due to his age. In October 2021, Hengelman joined Bulgarian First League side Pirin Blagoevgrad.

On 31 January 2022 it was announced that Hengelman had signed with Dutch club Go Ahead Eagles form Deventer, returning to the Netherlands for the remainder of the 2021–22 season.

References

External links
 

Living people
1989 births
Dutch footballers
Footballers from Enschede
Association football goalkeepers
AGOVV Apeldoorn players
Achilles '29 players
TOP Oss players
FC Twente players
Cape Town Spurs F.C. players
AFC Ajax players
OFC Pirin Blagoevgrad players
Go Ahead Eagles players
Eerste Divisie players
National First Division players
Dutch expatriate footballers
Dutch expatriate sportspeople in South Africa
Dutch expatriate sportspeople in Bulgaria
Expatriate soccer players in South Africa
Expatriate footballers in Bulgaria
Jong FC Twente players